Dinotopia is a series of fantasy children's books created by author and illustrator James Gurney.

Dinotopia may also refer to:

 Dinotopia (island), the setting of the Dinotopia books

Games
Dinotopia (video game), a 1996 computer game
Dinotopia: The Timestone Pirates, an April 2002 platform-based video game for Nintendo Game Boy Advance
Dinotopia: The Sunstone Odyssey, a July 2003 action-adventure video game released by Vicious Cycle Software

TV
Dinotopia (miniseries), a three-part TV miniseries from May 2002 co-produced by Walt Disney Television and Hallmark Entertainment
Dinotopia (TV series), a TV series from November 2002 which continued where the miniseries had left off

Film
 Dinotopia: Quest for the Ruby Sunstone, a 2005 American animated film directed by Davis Doi